The Statute of Praemunire (16 Ric 2 c 5) was an Act of the Parliament of England enacted in 1392, during the reign of Richard II. Its intention was to limit the powers of the papacy in England, by making it illegal to appeal an English court case to the pope if the king objected, or for anyone to act in a way that recognized papal authority over the authority of the king. This was later reaffirmed by the  Statute in Restraint of Appeals (Ecclesiastical Appeals Act 1532) in the reign of Henry VIII and was used to remove Thomas Wolsey from power. The word praemunire originally referred to the writ of summons issued against a person accused under this and similar statutes, and later came to mean offences against the statutes.

The whole Chapter was repealed by section 13 of, and Part I of Schedule 4 to, the Criminal Law Act 1967 for Great Britain and section 16 of, and Schedule 4 to, the Criminal Justice (Miscellaneous Provisions) Act (Northern Ireland) 1968 for Northern Ireland).

The whole of 16 Ric 2, of which this chapter was part, was repealed for the Republic of Ireland by section 1 of, and Part 2 of the Schedule to, the Statute Law Revision Act 1983.

See also
Praemunire
Thomas Wolsey

References
Halsbury's Statutes,

Further reading

Acts of the Parliament of England
1390s in law
1392 in England